Sally Rebecca Kohn (born March 27, 1977) is an American liberal political commentator, community organizer, and founder and chief executive officer of the Movement Vision Lab, a grassroots think tank that focuses on liberal and progressive ideas and positions. Kohn was a contributor for Fox News, and now regularly appears as a political commentator on CNN. Her writing is published in publications like The Washington Post and USA Today.

Early life and education
Kohn was born in Allentown, Pennsylvania, the daughter of Donald Kohn, an engineer, and Melinda Kohn, a computer programmer. Her family is Jewish.

Kohn was raised in Allentown, and attended Moravian Academy in Bethlehem, Pennsylvania. After graduating, Kohn pursued a bachelor's degree in psychology from George Washington University in Washington, D.C. She graduated from New York University School of Law with a juris doctor in 2002 and also has a master's degree in public administration from Robert F. Wagner Graduate School of Public Service. Kohn was a Root Tilden public service scholar at the New York University School of Law.

Career

Community organizing
Previously, Kohn was senior campaign strategist with the Center for Community Change, where she served as co-director. She also previously served as executive director of the Third Wave Foundation.  Kohn held a program fellowship at the Ford Foundation, helping to manage more than $15 million in annual grants. She was also a distinguished fellow at the National Gay and Lesbian Task Force Policy Institute.  Kohn has consulted at organizations such as the Urban Justice Center. She was also a strategic adviser to the Social Justice Infrastructure Funders.

Media career
She was recruited into TV by former TV executive Geraldine Laybourne

She has appeared on MSNBC shows The Ed Show, Up with Steve Kornacki, Now with Alex Wagner, and on
The Last Word with Lawrence O'Donnell. On May 4, 2018 she appeared as a guest on HBO’s Real Time with Bill Maher. Kohn has also published op-eds for outlets including Fox News, The Washington Post, The Nation, The Christian Science Monitor, and USA Today. She is also a contributor to The Huffington Post.

She served as a Fox News contributor until October 2013. She is currently a commentator on CNN.

Kohn supported Bernie Sanders in the Democratic primaries and then Hillary Clinton in the 2016 United States presidential election. On February 19, 2017, New York Post columnist Karol Markowicz wrote, in response to a recent tweet by Kohn, the following: "Last week, cable news personality Sally Kohn tweeted what she called a "straightforward" plan that would eject Donald Trump and install Hillary Clinton into the presidency: "1. Impeach Trump Pence; 2. Constitutional crisis; 3. Call special election; 4. Ryan v Clinton; 5. President Clinton." "Anyone with middle-school knowledge of the presidential chain of command should know that impeaching both Trump and his vice president would not, actually, lead to a "constitutional crisis" or a "special election" Markowicz adds. "It would lead directly, do not pass go, do not collect $200, to President Paul Ryan. Whom Clinton would be welcome to challenge in the next election."

Published works
Sally Kohn, The Opposite of Hate: A Field Guide to Repairing Our Humanity, 2018

Personal life
Kohn met her wife, Sarah Hansen, at the World Social Forum in Porto Alegre, Brazil, in 2003. Hansen works as an activist and consultant. Hansen was the executive director of the Environmental Grantmakers Association from 1998 to 2005. They have a daughter, Willa Hansen-Kohn, and live in Park Slope, Brooklyn.

See also
 LGBT culture in New York City
 List of LGBT people from New York City
 New Yorkers in journalism
 Political analysis
 United States cable news

References

External links

 

1977 births
Living people
Activists from Allentown, Pennsylvania
Activists from New York (state)
American women chief executives
American women lawyers
Columbian College of Arts and Sciences alumni
Jewish activists
Jewish American journalists
LGBT Jews
American LGBT journalists
LGBT people from Pennsylvania
Moravian Academy alumni
New York (state) lawyers
New York University School of Law alumni
People from Park Slope
Robert F. Wagner Graduate School of Public Service alumni
Writers from Allentown, Pennsylvania